In mathematics, a toroid is a surface of revolution with a hole in the middle. The axis of revolution passes through the hole and so does not intersect the surface. For example, when a rectangle is rotated around an axis parallel to one of its edges, then a hollow rectangle-section ring is produced. If the revolved figure is a circle, then the object is called a torus.

The term toroid is also used to describe a toroidal polyhedron. In this context a toroid need not be circular and may have any number of holes. A g-holed toroid can be seen as approximating the surface of a torus having a topological genus, g, of 1 or greater. The Euler characteristic χ of a g holed toroid is 2(1-g).

The torus is an example of a toroid, which is the surface of a doughnut. Doughnuts are an example of a solid torus created by rotating a disk, and should not be confused with toroids.

Equations 
A toroid is specified by the radius of revolution R measured from the center of the section rotated. For symmetrical sections volume and surface of the body may be computed (with circumference C and area A of the section):

Square toroid 
The volume (V) and surface area (S) of a toroid are given by the following equations, where A is the area of the square section of side, and R is the radius of revolution.

Circular toroid 
The volume (V) and surface area (S) of a toroid are given by the following equations, where r is the radius of the circular section, and R is the radius of the overall shape.

See also 
Toroidal inductors and transformers
Toroidal propellers
Annulus
Solenoid
Helix

Notes

External links

Topology
Geometric shapes